Fredrik Hallström (born 7 May 1966) is a Swedish curler.

Hallström started playing curling in 1975. He plays in first position and is right-handed.

In 2008 he was inducted into the Swedish Curling Hall of Fame.

References

1966 births
Living people
Swedish male curlers
Swedish curling champions
21st-century Swedish people